Kenneth Bergqvist (born 2 September 1968) is a former Swedish footballer. He made 48 Allsvenskan appearances for Djurgårdens IF and scored one goal.

Career
Bergqvist joined the senior team of Djurgårdens IF in the 1988 season. In 1991, he joined Spånga IS For the 1993 season, he re-joined Djurgårdens IF from Spånga IS. In 1997, he left Djurgårdens IF for Väsby IK.

References

Swedish footballers
Djurgårdens IF Fotboll players
Väsby IK players
Spånga IS players
Living people
1968 births
Place of birth missing (living people)
Allsvenskan players
Association football defenders